The 1909 Cornell Big Red football team was an American football team that represented Cornell University during the 1909 college football season.  In their first season under head coach George Walder, the Big Red compiled a 3–4–1 record and outscored all opponents by a combined total of 66 to 65.

Schedule

References

Cornell
Cornell Big Red football seasons
Cornell Big Red football